Miracle on Ice is a 1981 American sports docudrama about the United States men's national ice hockey team, led by head coach Herb Brooks (played by Karl Malden), that won the gold medal in the 1980 Winter Olympics. The USA team's victory over the heavily favored Soviet team in the medal round was dubbed the "Miracle on Ice". The film premiered on March 1, 1981, as an installment of The ABC Sunday Night Movie.

Plot
Hard-driving, no-nonsense coach Herb Brooks puts 68 of the best amateur hockey players through a series grueling workouts at Colorado Springs in the summer of 1979. Brooks needs to trim the list down to 20 before they can represent the United States at the 1980 Winter Olympics in Lake Placid, New York. Along the way, Brooks and his assistant coach Craig Patrick must deal with the players' agents and lawyers, who are only interested in the professional hockey contracts that await their clients. Among those clients is goaltender Jim Craig, who wants to pursue a pro career and worries that by joining the Olympics instead, he is placing his family in deeper financial straits. Brooks understands the players' financial difficulties and tries to find a corporate sponsor to cover the team's finances.

After the team list is finally posted, the team plays some exhibition games in Europe, where they post a respectable record (winning eight and only losing two games). But just as they are feeling great about their performance, they play the Minnesota North Stars and realize that their skills could still use improvement; furthermore, they recognize that beating the powerful Soviet Union team, who won the gold medal at the past four Olympic Games, will be a tremendous challenge. For their last exhibition game before the Olympics, they play against the Soviet Union at Madison Square Garden. Brooks realizes that this particular game will prove whether his team is ready to compete for the gold medal. The Soviets annihilate them by the score of 10–3, but newly installed captain Mike Eruzione refuses to let the team's spirit slide. In their opening game against the favored Swedish team, the United States is down two goals to one with less than a minute remaining in the game. Brooks pulls his goalie and the U.S. ties the game.

The next two games against Czechoslovakia and Norway both end with the U.S. victorious. The possibility of them making a run for a medal is now especially raised after they beat West Germany prior to their showdown with the Soviets. At the end of the first period in the medal round game between the U.S. and the Soviets, the score is tied. At the end of the second period, the U.S. trails by one goal. In the last few minutes of the game, the Soviet Union stages one last attack, but the U.S. is ultimately victorious. As the crowd at Olympic Center Ice Rink bursts into hysteria, Herb Brooks retreats to the locker room for some solitude, knowing they face Finland for the gold medal. Ultimately though, the United States do defeat Finland for the gold medal and Mike Eruzione urges his team to join him on the platform during the playing of the national anthem.

The film concludes with actual footage of the U.S. hockey team members receiving their medals, along with descriptions narrated by ABC Sports broadcaster Al Michaels of their accomplishments after the 1980 Olympics.

Cast

Mike Ramsey, Neal Broten, Steve Janaszak, Eric Strobel, Bob Suter, and Phil Verchota were not featured in the film except in archival footage of the gold medal ceremony.

Production
Miracle on Ice was directed by Steven Hilliard Stern and written by Lionel Chetwynd. It incorporates actual game footage and ABC broadcasters Al Michaels and Ken Dryden's original commentary from the 1980 Winter Games.

Stern closely watched videotapes of the Lake Placid games before setting up his scenes at the Los Angeles Sports Arena. These staged shots generally involved close-ups of the actors. The original ABC Sports footage showed the games in long or medium shots. The new material, also videotaped, was then carefully edited into the factual footage, and the result was transferred to film. This process was done in order to maintain the same picture quality throughout and not produce the 'checkerboard effect' according to co-producer Frank von Zerneck.

Mike Eruzione was a technical consultant on the film saying "we all know the movie will never be able to equal what happened." Eruzione however, wasn't involved with the latter Miracle film at all. According to Eruzione "I did not want to be involved in the movie. I felt if I was involved then my role would be different, and the guys on the team would have went, he didn’t do this, he didn’t say that. Oh, no, you were an advisor; no wonder why you did this. I stayed away from the movie. I think they interviewed a bunch of us and asked us questions, but we had no input into the movie."

Karl Malden told Sports Illustrated in December 1980 that he had never actually met Herb Brooks in preparation for his portrayal of him, but he studied him on videotape, especially his eyes. Malden said of Brooks "I'd hate to meet him in a dark alley. I think he's a little on the neurotic side. Maybe more than a little. Any moment you think he's going to jump out of his skin."

Malden also remarked with disapproval that Brooks could've ventured an occasional smile during one of the less intense games. Malden also wondered how, after working hard over the course of seven months that Brooks could have simply walked away after his team clinched the improbable victory against the Soviet team.

Reception
Bob Grimm of Tucson Weekly said that Miracle on Ice falls short of being even a good sports movie. It makes too many errors on and off the ice, failing to capture the essence of the sport it's studying, and reducing most of the men and women involved in the historical drama to caricature.

Outside of archive footage, defenseman Mike Ramsey wasn't depicted in Miracle on Ice. In the February 21, 1998 edition of The Buffalo News, Ramsey said "I also got paid for having my name in the TV movie that ABC did. It was about five years before I sat down and actually watched the movie. I sat back and said 'Uh, oh' when it was over because it wasn't too good. Some time after that, we (the Sabres) came into some city on a road trip at 2 a.m., and it was on TV. I think everyone on the team watched it, because the next morning everyone was busting my chops."

Patti Brooks, who is depicted in Miracle on Ice by Jessica Walter said in 2009 “I don’t know that I ever watched the whole movie.” In regards to Karl Malden's portrayal of her husband, she said “I remember Herbie would not watch it. People used to tease him about Karl Malden playing him. Would you? That would be like Ma Kettle playing me. But you always think that you’re sharper than others think you are. But to be honest, I don’t know why they chose him. I don’t think (Malden) ever went on the ice in his movie; he was too old.” Patti Brooks' brother, Terry Lane added "It was so bad", and was unable to fathom how Karl Malden, at age 69, could be cast in the role of the handsome Herb Brooks, who was 42 when the actual "Miracle on Ice" took place. Herb Brooks himself stated that his wife would've preferred Robert Redford to have played him.

Meanwhile, Mike Eruzione claimed to the Star Tribune that Brooks wanted Paul Newman to play him.

Miracle director Gavin O'Connor said that he remembers calling Herb Brooks to tell him that Karl Malden had been cast to play him and hearing a second or two of silence on the line before he replied, in a tone dripping with acid, ‘Isn’t he a bit old?’ On the other hand, Tom Jones of the Tampa Bay Times said that while the movie was a bit hokey and included some strange choices (such as Steve Guttenberg as goalie Jim Craig), Karl Malden pulled off a credible performance as the grumpy Herb Brooks.

John J. O'Connor of the New York Times said  "Miracle on Ice is a fine example of the inspirational sports film. Nothing is said of the many career disappointments suffered by the players since the Olympics, but this film is meant to recapture an extraordinary moment, which it does." O'Connor did however also say that Miracle on Ice was sprinkled liberally with silly bits of business and ludicrous efforts to inject some romance into the scenario. For instance, every so often, a beautiful woman would suggestively approach one of the players, only to disappear quickly as, under Herb Brooks' orders. O'Connor added that outside of Mike Eruzione and Jim Craig, the rest of the team is just a collection of faces passing quickly before the cameras, identified only by the names on the backs of their uniforms. Meanwhile, O'Connor argued that other characters such as Patti Brooks as the loyally supportive and enthusiastic wife and Jim Craig's father, Donald (a devoted fan carrying a religious medal for good luck), are little more than plot conveniences.

33 years later, Victor Mather of the New York Times said that while Miracle on Ice was "Much less inspired than its successor (2004's Miracle), it still delivers a chill or two at its climax."

Entertainment Weekly gave Miracle on Ice a B-, saying "Watching Andrew Stevens and Steve Guttenberg trying to make like hockey players is itself faintly chilling. But the on-ice action is the real thing, and the thrills have not diminished a bit."

Differences with Miracle (2004)
The story of the United States men's national hockey team's gold medal victory at the 1980 Winter Olympics was retold in Miracle, starring Kurt Russell as Herb Brooks.

Whereas 1981's Miracle on Ice reused clips from ABC's actual broadcasts of the games blended in with some quick close-ups for the written footage, Miracle used real hockey players as actors and reshot the whole games. Also recreated in Miracle was the commentary by Al Michaels and Ken Dryden (with the exception of Michaels' now legendary "Do you believe in miracles? Yes!" line as the filmmakers felt that it would've been impossible to ask Michaels to recreate the genuine emotion and enthusiasm during the heat of that particular moment).

It could be argued that Miracle on Ice manages to tell a lot more about some of the players than Miracle did. For instance, in Miracle on Ice, more is told of goalie Jim Craig, and his relationship with his father that culminated in the dramatic moment of him draped in an American flag at the end of the gold medal game, looking for his dad in the stands. There's also scenes in Miracle on Ice that touches upon the players' socio-economic backgrounds, such as one where Craig tells his father that remaining an amateur is costly for their family. Miracle instead, plays up regional tensions between Eastern and Western college hockey divisions to amplify the idea of conflict within the ranks.

There was however, no mention of international affairs in Miracle on Ice, save for one huddled protest against the Soviet invasion of Afghanistan in the pre-Olympic match-up against the Soviets at Madison Square Garden. Miracle meanwhile, showed how America was experiencing a crisis of confidence at that time (Watergate, hostages in Iran, Three Mile Island, ongoing energy crisis, etc.) of the 1980 Winter Olympics.

Whereas Miracle gave us the story of Ralph Cox, the last man cut from the team, Miracle on Ice tells this story from the perspective of Les Auge, who was in fact the second to last man cut from the team. We also learn in Miracle on Ice of Mike Eruzione's decision to never play professional hockey after being captain of the gold medal team. Auge is depicted as urging Eruinoze to reconsider retiring prior to the Olympics to take a position as an assistant coach on the national team. All in all, while Miracle on Ice went more onto the individual players' careers outside of the Olympics, Miracle focused more on Herb Brooks molding them into a team.

When asked about Steve Guttenberg's portrayal of him by the New York Post in February 2010, Jim Craig said, "I think that Steve Guttenberg did a good job in showing my more rambunctious side." Meanwhile, when asked about Eddie Cahill's portrayal of him in Miracle, Craig said, "Eddie did an excellent job. He did a super job conveying my intensity and passion for the mission." Craig did add however, “It was great to have Eddie play me in the second movie. He’s better-looking than Guttenberg."

Ken Morrow in Miracle on Ice is accurately bearded unlike in Miracle. Herb Brooks specifically made a rule to allow Morrow to keep his beard for the team, based on his having a beard prior to joining the team.

In December 2007, Tony Granato, who served as head coach of Team USA at the 2018 Winter Olympics, was interviewed by ESPN's Steve Wulf. When the subject came to how he would have to form a family of 25 players in a week, Granato said that he could show them Miracle with Kurt Russell. But Granato quickly followed it up by saying "Actually, I'm partial to the earlier movie about the team, Miracle on Ice, with Karl Malden as Herb Brooks."

Mike Eruzione however joked that besides offering a far more handsome and hockey-knowledgeable alternative to Karl Malden, Kurt Russell was “Somebody with a better nose.” Nathan West, who played Rob McClanahan in Miracle said while joking with reporters about the 1981 film, "What TV movie?"

Historical inaccuracies
Prior to the start of the film, Al Michaels reads a disclaimer stating that for dramatic purposes, composite characters and time compression was used in some instances. With that being said, Andrew Stevens, who portrayed Mike Eruzione, did so shooting with his right hand even though Eruzione actually shot with his left hand. Eruzione himself also claimed that Donna (Lucinda Dooling), his girlfriend depicted in the film is fictional. Therefore, the two scenes involving her character (where she's on a picnic with Eruzione in the Public Garden in Boston early on in the film, and when she must leave him and return home right before the climax) never happened in real life.

In the U.S. team's locker room prior to the medal round game against the Soviets, Herb Brooks says to his team "Whatever it costs us personally to get here, it was worth it. Don't blow it. You'll take it to your grave!" While the real Brooks did roughly say to his team "You'll take it to your grave!", it was actually during the second intermission of gold medal game against Finland, when the U.S. was down 2–1.

Soundtrack
"Homeward Bound" (Simon & Garfunkel song) - This is featured during musical interlude on a bus trip throughout Europe with one of the players singing with a guitar. In September 1979, before the Olympics, the American team started exhibition play for a total of 61 games in five months against teams from Europe and the United States.

Home media
TryLon Video released Miracle on Ice on VHS in the U.S. in 1989. It was also released on VHS and Betamax in the UK and Europe by Video Form, and on LaserDisc in Japan. To date, the film remains unreleased on DVD, Blu-ray, or streaming most likely due to the popularity of the 2004 remake Miracle.

See also
List of sports films

References

External links

Ice hockey at the 1980 Winter Olympics
American television films
Sports films based on actual events
Films about the 1980 Winter Olympics
American ice hockey films
Cold War films
1981 television films
1981 films
ABC network original films
Films set in 1979
Films set in 1980
Films scored by Fred Karlin
Biographical films about sportspeople
Cultural depictions of hockey players
Cultural depictions of American men
Cultural depictions of Russian men
ABC Motion Pictures films
Filmways films
Films directed by Steven Hilliard Stern
Films set in Colorado
Films set in New York (state)
Films set in Minnesota
Films set in Boston
Films set in Europe
Films shot in Los Angeles
1980s English-language films
1980s American films